Richard Harry Palmer (born April 9, 1947) is an American former Linebacker who spent four seasons in the National Football League (NFL), playing with the Miami Dolphins, Buffalo Bills, New Orleans Saints and Atlanta Falcons. Palmer appeared in 43 total career games.

References

Living people
1947 births
American football linebackers
Players of American football from Lexington, Kentucky
Miami Dolphins players
Buffalo Bills players
New Orleans Saints players
Atlanta Falcons players
Kentucky Wildcats football players